Steam Mill Branch is a river in Delaware County, New York. It flows into East Branch Cold Spring Creek north of Barbourville.

Steam Mill State Forest

Steam Mill Branch flows through Steam Mill State Forest. The  state forest is accessed by Steam Mill Road, Mormon Hollow Road and Carroll Hill Road. It is almost totally forested with plantations and naturally, which will provide good hunting opportunities for most game species. The forest also has hiking and snowmobile trails and limited fishing opportunities on the Steam Mill Branch.

References

Rivers of New York (state)
Rivers of Delaware County, New York